The 2003–04 Coupe de France was the 87th edition of the annual French cup competition. It was won by Paris Saint-Germain. The cup finalist LB Châteauroux qualified for the UEFA Cup because PSG qualified to 2004–05 UEFA Champions League through league table position.

Round of 16

Quarter-finals

Semi-finals

Final

Topscorer
Pauleta (5 goals)

External links
2003–04 Cup at French Football Federation 
2003–04 Coupe de France at ScoreShelf.com

2003–04 domestic association football cups
2003–04 in French football
2003-04